Ormiston College, located in Redland City, Queensland, Australia, is an independent, co-educational, non-denominational Christian school, for students from prep to year 12. The school also has an Early Learning Centre for children between 15 months and 5 years.  The headmaster, (Brett Webster), currently enrolls over 600 Prep through year 7 students and over 700 Senior School students, and has a staff of over 150 teachers and support staff.

History
Ormiston College opened in 1942 on the 1 acre site, with 162 students in only 1 classroom. Ormiston College Limited, a non-profit, public company, was formed to develop the school and the Board of Directors was established to assist in the administration of the College.  Over time, additional land was purchased and facilities were built.  The school expanded to include a Senior School (starting from year 8) in 1991, Pre-school (Prep) in 2000 and the Early Learning Centre (Childcare Centre) in 2007

Curriculum
The Junior School curriculum establishes academic foundations and cultural knowledge, as well as sporting programs.

The Middle School in the college is for students in year 7-9. Within the Middle School, core subjects are compulsory in all years, however in year 9, electives may be chosen.

In the Senior School, Foundation Studies begin in year 10. Starting from year 9, students are able to choose some electives.

Ormiston College is a member of the TAS (The Associated Schools) sporting program and the Bayside District and Metropolitan East Region sporting associations.

According to the My Choice Schools ranking, Ormiston College ranks 4th in Brisbane for academic results.

Pastoral care
Ormiston College provides permanent, on-campus pastoral support and guidance for students and their parents. Each teacher is supported in providing pastoral care by a student support services team comprising two counselors, year level coordinators, the dean of students, and the college chaplain.

Facilities
Ormiston College has a range of quality student facilities, including the brand new Admin Building, which cost $7 million to build, the Lingo Lin Performing Arts Theatre (including a theatre, drama studio, and music rooms), the Somerset Sports Centre and the Marsson Aquatic Centre, a science centre (including physics, biology, and chemistry laboratories), nine computer laboratories, and a Library Resource Centre.The new Centre of Learning and innovation had a budget of $10~15 million to construct.

Alumni
 Clare Nott, Paralympic medal-winning wheelchair basketball player
 Mirusia Louwerse, ARIA-topping soprano singer
 Shayna Jack, Commonwealth Games medal-winning swimmer

See also
List of schools in Queensland

References

External links
Ormiston College website

Private secondary schools in Brisbane
Educational institutions established in 1988
Nondenominational Christian schools in Brisbane
Junior School Heads Association of Australia Member Schools
Schools in South East Queensland
1988 establishments in Australia
The Associated Schools member schools